Anacleto Cordeiro Gonçalves de Oliveira (17 July 1946 – 18 September 2020) was a Portuguese Roman Catholic bishop.

Gonçalves de Oliveira was born in Portugal and was ordained to the priesthood in 1970. He served as auxiliary bishop of the Roman Catholic Archdiocese of Lisbon, Portugal, from 2005 to 2010. He then served as bishop of the Roman Catholic Diocese of Viana do Castelo, Portugal, from 2010 until his death in 2020 in a traffic accident.

References

1946 births
2020 deaths
Road incident deaths in Portugal
21st-century Roman Catholic bishops in Portugal